Eske may refer to:

 Eske, a village in the East Riding of Yorkshire, England
 River Eske, a river in Southwest County Donegal, Ireland
 Lough Eske, a lake in Southwest County Donegal, Ireland